Jordi Camps Riba (born Barcelona, 5 May 1973) is a Spanish rugby union player. He plays as a prop and as flanker.

Career
At club level, he played for U.E. Santboiana and for the Scottish club Currie RFC.
His first international cap was against Italy, at Madrid, on 14 February 1993. Along with his fellow U.E. Santboiana players such as Steve Tuineau, Oriol Ripol, Víctor Torres and Alberto Malo, He was also part of the 1999 Rugby World Cup roster, playing two matches in the tournament.
During a senior tournament in Bermuda, he and Alberto Malo - who then were playing for Iberia Classic team - were invited by Buck Shelford to play for the Classic All Blacks in the match for the Silver Cup against Argentina, due to shortage of players in the New Zealand team. The match was eventually won by the New Zealand team.

References

External links
Jordi Camps international statistics

1973 births
Living people
Sportspeople from Barcelona
Rugby union players from Catalonia
Spanish rugby union players
Spanish expatriate sportspeople in Scotland
Rugby union props
Spain international rugby union players
Spanish expatriate rugby union players
Expatriate rugby union players in Scotland